Guerrilla Funk is the third studio album by American rapper Paris. It was released on October 4, 1994, via Priority Records, and has been re-released in a limited 2003 release subtitled The Deluxe Edition via Guerrilla Funk Recordings; it was digitally enhanced, reworked, and contains alternate versions.

Track listing

Sample credits
"Outta My Life"
"Yearning for Your Love" by The Gap Band
"Bring It To Ya"
"Knucklehead" by Grover Washington Jr.
"Guerilla Funk"
"(Not Just) Knee Deep" by Funkadelic
"Dukey Stick" by George Duke
"The Big Bang Theory" by Parliament
"It's Real"
"(Not Just) Knee Deep" by Funkadelic
"Atomic Dog" by George Clinton
"One Time Fo' Ya Mind"
"Think (About It)" by Lyn Collins
"Whatcha See?"
"Hold It Now, Hit It" by Beastie Boys
"I Get Around" by 2Pac

Personnel
Oscar Jerome Jackson, Jr. – main artist, producer
Carla "CMG" Green – vocals (track 6)
Karryl "Special One" Smith – vocals (track 6)
Da Old Skool – vocals (track 9)
Eric Bertraud – saxophone
Eric Dodd – engineering
Todd D. Smith – artwork
Victor Hall – photography

Chart history

References

External links 
Guerrilla Funk The Deluxe Edition on Guerrilla Funk Recordings

1994 albums
G-funk albums
Paris (rapper) albums
Priority Records albums
Political music albums by American artists